Mildred Helen Shay (September 26, 1911 – October 15, 2005) was an American film actress of the 1930s whose affairs, marriages and glamorous social life became a popular subject for gossip columnists. At five-feet tall, Shay was dubbed the "Pocket Venus" by Hollywood gossip columnists.

Early life
Shay was born in Cedarhurst, New York, the eldest daughter of a wealthy lawyer, Joseph A. Shay, and his wife, Lillian. She attended New York schools and a Swiss finishing school in France until age 14, when her father moved her and her younger sister, Adeline, to London. The family also lived in a house in Florence and a French chateau in Nice.

When Shay was 19 years old, the family moved to Hollywood because of her father's work on behalf of various movie studios. She lived with her mother and sister at the Garden of Allah apartments which was populated by film stars. The family's friends and neighbors included Laurence Olivier, Harpo Marx, Gary Cooper and Ginger Rogers whom Shay said was her spa and skinny-dipping partner.

Career
When Shay decided she wanted to be an actress, her father contacted the heads of Fox and Paramount movies studio for their help. Quickly, she was given her first screen test with Douglas Fairbanks Jr. and then studied acting with Clark Gable's wife, Josephine Dillon. Her first screen roles were small uncredited parts in such films as The Age of Consent (1932),  A Bill of Divorcement (1932) starring John Barrymore and Billie Burke, and Roman Scandals (1933) with Eddie Cantor. Shay also dubbed the voice of Greta Garbo in Grand Hotel.

Shay took a break from acting during her first marriages. After the second ended, she acted on Broadway in The Sap Runs High. She then returned to Hollywood in 1939 to play Joan Crawford's scene-stealing French maid in The Women. According to Shay, her friend Groucho Marx thought she had a gift for comedy and offered to write material for her, but Shay refused because she wanted to be known as a "serious" actress.

After moving to England during World War II, and except for the 1948 film I Killed the Count, Shay gave up acting for the next two decades.

In 1968 she returned to acting with a small role in the Julie Andrews film Star!. She appeared in the 1974 remake of The Great Gatsby. In 1976, director Ken Russell asked her to play an "aged American desperate for attention" in Valentino, his biography of Rudolph Valentino, in which she got to dance with the film's star, Rudolf Nureyev. Shay continued to act and make small appearances over the next 30 years including appearances in Candleshoe (1977),  Superman III (1983), Death Wish 3 (1985), Little Shop of Horrors (1986) and Bullseye! (1990). Her last film was 1999's Parting Shots.

Social life
Although mostly an ingenue screen actress, Shay became well-publicized for her social life and romances. She was chauffeured around Hollywood in a Mercedes-Benz limousine, to the studios as well as parties and events. Although of diminutive stature, her beauty attracted many admirers, and Walter Winchell dubbed her "Hollywood's Pocket Venus". Shay's dates included Errol Flynn, Howard Hughes, Johnny Weissmuller, Victor Mature, Roy Rogers and Cecil B. DeMille.

Shay married Thomas Francis Murphy in 1934. Murphy has been described as an attractive Irishman as well as a drunken philanderer who accumulated large debts. The marriage ended within the year. Shay remarried in 1936 to Winthrop Gardiner, a member of a prominent New York family descended from Lord Lion Gardiner. After only six months, Shay filed for divorce because of Gardiner's much-publicized affair with ice skater Sonja Henie whom he later married.

In 1940, Shay met British army captain Geoffrey Steele and fell in love. The couple married in 1941 amid speculation and bets by the tabloid magazines about how long the union would last. Shay said, "Most gave it 3 to 6 months. Nobody gave us forty years." The couple remained married until Steel died in 1987.

During World War II, Shay moved to England with Steele where she gave birth to a daughter, Georgiana. Over the next few decades she frequented Buckingham Palace and became a prominent figure in London society circles.

Final years
Shay suffered a stroke in 2004. Her final public appearance was the National Film Theatre's 2004 tribute to her favorite director, George Cukor. Shay died at the age of 94 in California while visiting her daughter, Georgiana Waller, the former wife of musician Gordon Waller.

Partial filmography

In Old Missouri (1940) - Mme. Chee-Chee
Ride, Tenderfoot, Ride (1940) - Stewardess
Valentino (1977) - Old Lady at Maxim's
Candleshoe (1977) - Mrs. McCress
Funny Money (1983) - Mrs. Keller
Death Wish 3 (1985) - Magda, Emil's Wife 
Little Shop of Horrors (1986) - Second Customer
Bullseye! (1990) - Jolene, Tourist Wife

Further reading

References

External links 

1911 births
2005 deaths
American film actresses
People from Cedarhurst, New York
20th-century American actresses
21st-century American women